Jeff Berry may refer to:  

 Jeff Berry (baseball agent) (born 1969), American attorney and baseball agent
 Jeff Berry (footballer) (born 1957), Australian rules footballer
 Jeff Berry (Ku Klux Klan) ( 1953–2013), former Klan leader
 Jeff Berry (mixologist) (born c. 1958), American writer and historian of Tiki culture

See also
Jeff Barry (born 1938) American singer-songwriter and record producer
Jeff Barry (baseball) (born 1969), American baseball outfielder